In some countries there is an overpopulation of pets such as cats, dogs, and exotic animals. In the United States, six to eight million animals are brought to shelters each year, of which an estimated three to four million are subsequently euthanized, including 2.7 million considered healthy and adoptable. Euthanasia numbers have declined since the 1970s, when U.S. shelters euthanized an estimated 12 to 20 million animals. Most humane societies, animal shelters and rescue groups urge animal caregivers to have their animals spayed or neutered to prevent the births of unwanted and accidental litters that could contribute to this dynamic.

Global effects
Dealing with a population of unwanted domestic animals is a major concern to animal welfare and animal rights groups. Domestic animal overpopulation can be an ecological concern, as well as a financial problem: capturing, impounding and eventual euthanasia costs taxpayers and private agencies millions of dollars each year. Unwanted pets released into the wild may contribute to severe ecosystem damage (e.g. the effect of introducing exotic snakes into Florida's Everglades).

Statistics

Bahrain
In Bahrain the number of stray dogs has been increasing since early 2000s with the situation getting out of hand in late 2010s which caused a lot of controversy regarding the case from people claiming to be bothered and attacked by stray dogs and stray dogs puppies being inhumanely murdered (or burned). On the other hand, since 2014 an act has been put by the Bahrain Society for the Prevention of Cruelty to Animals (BSPCA) and made a plea to the government to help keep the Catch, Neuter and Return programme (CNVR) running. Frequent attacks on farms also happened, Sheikha Marwa bint Abdulrahman Al Khalifa also contributed to the case and decided to build a shelter (welfare) for the strays to neuter and rehabilitate them to prevent further attacks while also cooperating with the Bahrain stray dogs society group.

Canada
The Canadian Federation of Humane Societies (CFHS) has been collecting statistics from Canadian animal shelters since 1993. A survey in 2013 included data from 100 of 186 humane societies and SPCAs. However, municipal animal services agencies were not included, hence "the data in this report represents only a fraction of homeless companion animals in Canada." In 2012, the surveyed shelters took in just over 188,000 animals, and euthanized 65,423 animals, representing 35% of all intakes. Six times as many cats were euthanized as dogs, or 41% of cats and 15% of dogs. The report said a gradually improving trend, but that cats have a far worse outcome than dogs: "More than twice as many cats enter shelters than dogs, and though adoption rates for cats are similar to those for dogs, fewer cats are reclaimed and many more are euthanized."

United States
Estimates of animals brought to shelters and of animals subsequently euthanized in the U.S. have issues with their reliability. The Humane Society of the United States provides shelter statistics with this caution: "There is no central data reporting system for U.S. animal shelters and rescues. These estimates are based on information provided by the (former) National Council on Pet Population Study and Policy." The HSUS provided numbers of 6 to 8 million animals taken to shelters, 3 to 4 million animals euthanized, and 2.7 million of the euthanized animals being healthy and adoptable, as estimates for 2012–2013, and also for annual figures in an August 2014 article.

The National Council on Pet Population Study and Policy conducted a survey over four years, 1994–1997, and cautions against the use of their survey for wider estimates: "It is not possible to use these statistics to estimate the numbers of animals entering animal shelters in the United States, or the numbers euthanized on an annual basis. The reporting Shelters may not represent a random sampling of U.S. shelters." Summary statistics from the survey said that in 1997, 4.3 million animals entered the surveyed shelters; the shelters euthanized 62.6% of them, or 2.8 million animals. These numbers broke down to 56.4% of dogs euthanized, and 71% of cats. The original survey was sent to 5,042 shelters housing at least 100 dogs and cats each year, of whom only 1,008 shelters participated in 1997.

The American Society for the Prevention of Cruelty to Animals provides alternate numbers, saying that there are about 13,600 community animal shelters in the US. "There is no national organization monitoring these shelters", and "no government institution or animal organization is responsible for tabulating national statistics for the animal protection movement." However, national estimates are provided of 7.6 million animals entering shelters each year, with 2.7 million of them euthanized.

The American Humane Association said the difficulties in estimating numbers, and provides a higher figure, saying that in 2008, an estimated 3.7 million animals were euthanized in shelters. A 1993 study of US dog populations considered a wider range of sources than animal shelters. The study found that 4 million dogs entered shelters, with 2.4 million (or 60%) euthanized (p. 203).

Reasons for relinquishment
Unwanted dogs and cats may have been acquired from any source. Large numbers of animals are placed in shelters by pet owners each year for reasons such as moving, allergies, behavioral problems, and lack of time or money, or the pet animal giving birth to young. Another common reason for surrendering a pet is because of milestones, like marriage or the birth of a new baby.

During multiple interviews conducted by Colorado State University gradates and other college graduates, it was found that over 3,000 pet owners were asked about their relinquishment of domestic animals. Of those owners about 3,600 dogs and litters and 1,400 cats and litters have been relinquished. According to the university’s research, some of the top 10 reasons for relinquishment were problems with other pets in the house, the owner having personal problems, landlords not allowing pets, and cost. The university found that the top reason for relinquishment is aggression towards people. Based on third party research conducted by Canine Journal, it was found that 1 in 73 people will be a victim to dog bites. However, some breeds tend to bite more than other breeds.

According to ASPCA the two other major reasons for relinquishment, other than behavioral problems with the pet, are family situations and housing issues. Of these pets that are being "re-homed", ASPCA provides statistics showing 37% of these pets are re-homed with a friend or family member.  Shelters become the new "home" for 36% of relinquished pets, even though many people would want this to be their last resort. Each year 6.5 million domestic pets enter shelters, these shelters are being massively overwhelmed by the intake of animals.  Most shelters are not capable of getting all of these animals adopted, which unfortunately leads to many animals being euthanized.

Purebred animals
The American Pet Products Association says that since purebreds are only 5% to 6% of the US pet cat population, the overpopulation problem is mainly due to mixed or random bred animals, and avoiding purebred cats would make little difference. The Humane Society of the United States (HSUS) says that 25% of the dogs who enter animal shelters are purebred.

The American Kennel Club (AKC) and the Cat Fanciers' Association (CFA) say the benefits of purebred dogs or cats include that they have been developed over time to show specific traits that are useful for hunting, rescue, assistance and other needs. Animal buyers, including pet owners, may choose a purebred to ensure they know ahead of time the size and other characteristics a young animal will grow into. The CFA also says that purebred cats may make better pets because they have a weaker hunting instinct. The HSUS says that a pedigree is not a guarantee of health and temperament, and that mixed breed dogs and cats often show good characteristics of both breeds, and may be less likely to have genetic defects.

The AKC says breeders offer services and information about the animals they sell, such as a detailed pedigree, and expertise in the health and temperament of the breed they specialize in. The HSUS says animal shelters may offer animals that have already had necessary veterinary procedures, such as spaying or neutering, vaccination, deworming, and microchipping.

The best practices set by the AKC for responsible breeders include screening customers so animals are placed in a good home, and follow up services including collecting long term health and development data about animals they have bred, and guaranteeing to take back any animals if their situation is not mutually beneficial for the pet and the owner, and then placing them in a new home. The AKC says that their organization serves to prevent animal cruelty by suspending the benefits of their breed registry and other services from members convicted of animal cruelty, and that their inspection program actively uncovers cases of inhumane treatment of dogs. The HSUS says the AKC has lobbied against laws to stop puppy mills, and that many of the breeders certified as humane by AKC inspectors were later convicted of animal cruelty offenses, while the AKC says it has favored legislation that is necessary, but worked to stop well-intentioned laws that are unenforceable or counterproductive, such as kennel population limits that may harm genetic diversity. The HSUS does not advocate banning breeding but encourages prospective pet owners to seek a breed rescue organization rather than buying directly from a breeder.

Backyard breeding and puppy mills are motivated by profit and the perceived high demand for a particular breed, often without concern for the health or welfare of the animals involved. These animals may be sold through pet stores or directly from the breeders themselves. The AKC says that negligence and cruelty to animals is illegal throughout the US, and that the solution to irresponsible breeding is more effective enforcement of the law, rather than blaming responsible breeders or the demand for purebred animals. The CFA's legislative stance is similar to the AKC. The CFA also says that cat overpopulation is due to free roaming, unaltered pet cats, and feral cats, not purebreds. The CFA says that animal control agencies have failed to publicize complete statistics on the killing of dogs and cats that are dangerously aggressive, concealing the degree to which pet animal euthanasia will always be unavoidable.

Opposition to premise
Nathan Winograd of the No Kill Advocacy Center, a promoter of no-kill shelters, says that overpopulation is a myth and logical fallacy, which many animal control agencies use to avoid criticism for high numbers of killings and low numbers of adoptions. Winograd says that traditional shelters kill animals primarily out of habit and convenience, even when space is available for the animals. He says that using trap-neuter-return (TNR) for stray and feral cats, his organizations have been able to save all healthy and treatable animals, and raise their save rates to at least 90% of all impounded animals. He says there are enough homes for all the homeless animals: "Based on the number of existing households with pets who have a pet die or run away, more homes potentially become available each year for cats than the number of cats who enter shelters, while more than twice as many homes potentially become available each year for dogs than the number of dogs who enter shelters." Winograd says his methods, including TNR for stray and feral cats, and comprehensive changes in animal control, rescue, shelter and community efforts have succeeded in saving all healthy and treatable animals, amounting to at least 90% of all impounded animals. Winograd says that hundreds of No Kill Communities have been created across the U.S., and they are increasing in number throughout the world. In October 2014, the website "Out the Front Door" documented 212 communities in the U.S. saving more than 90% of impounded animals.

Christie Keith, social media adviser for animal welfare organizations, said in 2012 that the use of the term "overpopulation" to justify shelter killings involves the logical fallacy of a tautology. If a shelter with no adoption program was able to save more animals when a program was added and then enhanced, was the improvement in save rates due to a "Reduction in 'pet over-population'? Or improvement in shelter management practices?" When communities are able to save more than 90% of the animals admitted, Keith asks, "Did they reduce 'pet over-population,' or did they become a no-kill community by implementing modern, proven, progressive sheltering practices?"

In a 2008 article, dog advocate Loretta Baughan said that underpopulation was the reality rather than overpopulation. She said that the great majority of pet owners have spayed or neutered their pets, and some shelters were importing large numbers of dogs from other jurisdictions.

See also
Spay and neuter
Immunocontraception

References

Further reading
American Humane, on pet overpopulation
Nathan Winograd, (2009), Redemption: The Myth of Pet Overpopulation and the No Kill Revolution in America. Almaden Books, 2nd edition. .

Population ecology

Animal shelters
Animal welfare
Cats as pets
Dogs as pets